Portrait of Eleanor of Aragon is a marble sculpture of Eleanor of Aragon, originally carved by Francesco Laurana in 1468 for her tomb but now in the Palazzo Abatellis in Palermo. It is very iconographically similar to Bust of a Princess (Louvre).

Bibliography (in Italian)
David Alberto Murolo; Storie della Vrana: destini incrociati tra arte e guerra: Luciano e Francesco Laurana, Giovanni Vrana, Yusuf Maskovic, REMEL, Ancona, 2016 -
Pierluigi De Vecchi ed Elda Cerchiari, I tempi dell'arte, volume 2, Bompiani, Milano 1999. 

Sculptures in Palazzo Abatellis
Eleanor of Aragon
Eleanor of Aragon
Eleanor of Aragon
1468 sculptures
Marble sculptures
Busts in Italy
Sculptures by Francesco Laurana